

Max Fremerey (5 May 1889 – 20 September 1968) was a German general in the Wehrmacht during World War II who commanded several divisions. He was a recipient of the Knight's Cross of the Iron Cross.

Awards and decorations

 Knight's Cross of the Iron Cross on 28 July 1942 as Generalmajor and commander of 29. Infanterie-Division (motorisiert)

References

Citations

Bibliography

 

1889 births
1968 deaths
Lieutenant generals of the German Army (Wehrmacht)
German Army personnel of World War I
Recipients of the clasp to the Iron Cross, 1st class
Recipients of the Gold German Cross
Recipients of the Knight's Cross of the Iron Cross
German prisoners of war in World War II
Military personnel from Cologne
German commanders at the Battle of Stalingrad
People from the Rhine Province
German Army generals of World War II